The 1981–82 Divizia C was the 26th season of Liga III, the third tier of the Romanian football league system.

Team changes

To Divizia C
Relegated from Divizia B
 Borzești
 ROVA Roșiori
 Metalul Aiud
 Minerul Gura Humorului
 Poiana Câmpina
 Metalurgistul Cugir
 Cimentul Medgidia
 Nitramonia Făgăraș
 Minerul Moldova Nouă
 Chimia Brăila
 Sirena București
 Minerul Anina

Promoted from County Championship
 Integrata Pașcani
 Rapid Panciu
 Metalul Huși
 Minerul Filipeștii de Pădure
 ASA Chimia Buzău
 Autobuzul Făurei
 Granitul Babadag
 Dinamo Victoria București
 Petrolul Roata de Jos 
 Dunărea Venus Zimnicea
 Constructorul Pitești
 Chimia Găești
 Parângul Novaci
 Mecanica Alba Iulia
 Minerul Aninoasa
 Bihorul Beiuș
 Chimia Arad
 Chimia Tășnad
 Silvania Cehu Silvaniei
 Bradul Vișeu de Sus
 Metalotehnica Târgu Mureș
 Unirea Cristuru Secuiesc
 Utilajul Făgăraș
 Metalul Sfântu Gheorghe

From Divizia C
Promoted to Divizia B
 Constructorul Iași
 Relonul Săvinești
 Victoria Tecuci
 Dunărea Călărași
 Automatica București
 Energie Slatina
 Drobeta-Turnu Severin
 Strungul Arad
 Someșul Satu Mare
 Minerul Ilba-Seini
 Carpați Mârșa
 ICIM Brașov

Relegated to County Championship
 Zimbrul Suceava
 Unirea Siret
 FEPA 74 Bârlad
 Hușana Huși
 Dacia Unirea Brăila
 Tractorul Viziru
 Electrica Constanța
 Unirea Eforie Nord
 Voința București
 Petrolul Bolintin-Vale
 Petrolul Târgoviște
 IPC Slatina
 Progresul Băilești
 Victoria Craiova
 CPL Caransebeș
 Metalul Oțelu Roșu
 Victoria Elcond Zalău
 Metalul Carei
 Silvicultorul Maieru
 Electrozahăr Târgu Mureș
 Metalul Copșa Mică
 Construcții Sibiu
 Constructorul Sfântu Gheorghe
 CSU Brașov

Renamed teams 
Dorna Vatra Dornei was renamed as Minerul Vatra Dornei.

Rapid Panciu was renamed as Viticultorul Panciu.

Olimpia Râmnicu Sărat was renamed as Ferodoul Râmnicu Sărat.

Chimia Buzău was renamed as ASA Chimia Buzău.

Șantierul Naval Brăila was renamed as Șantierul Naval ITA Brăila.

Minerul Râmnicu Vâlcea was moved from Râmnicu Vâlcea to Horezu and was renamed as Minerul Horezu.

ICIM Ploiești was moved during the winter break from Ploiești to Mizil and was renamed as ASA Mizil.

Sirena București was renamed during the winter break as Aversa București.

CPL Sebeș was renamed as Șurianu Sebeș.

Șoimii Strungul Lipova was renamed as Șoimii Lipova

Other changes 
Victoria Tecuci took the place of Oțelul Galați in Divizia B.

Metalosport Galați took the place of Victoria Tecuci.

Arrubium Măcin took the place of Viitorul Mahmudia.

CFR Caransebeș and Victoria Caransebeș merged, the second one being absorbed by the first one and was renamed as CFR Victoria Caransebeș.

League tables

Seria I

Seria II

Seria III

Seria IV

Seria V

Seria VI

Seria VII

Seria VIII

Seria IX

Seria X

Seria XI

Seria XII

See also 
 1981–82 Divizia A
 1981–82 Divizia B
 1981–82 County Championship
 1981–82 Cupa României

References 

Liga III seasons
3
Romania